Aerovía is a multimodal mass transportation system (by cable and power bus) that contributes to sustainability and urban integration between Guayaquil and Durán, improving the mobility style of its users, transporting them in a safe, comfortable, agile, affordable way, efficient, inclusive and friendly with the environment.

General information 
The Aerovía has five stations, one is technical and does not receive passengers. It has 154 cabins with capacity for ten passengers, but due to capacity restrictions, five or six users can enter. The fare costs $ 0.70 and in Durán users can use the urban buses of two cooperatives at no additional cost, which take them to the most representative populated sectors of the neighboring canton.

Infrastructure 
The Aerovía consists of a cable car line (Guayaquil - Durán Line) with a length of 4 km, 5 stations and 154 cabins.

See also 
 Cable car
 Metrovia
 Metrocable (Medellín)

References

Transport in Ecuador
Metrovia
Guayaquil
Gondola lifts